One Last Look is a 1967 play by American playwright Steve Carter. During a funeral service, mourners reflect on their relationship with the deceased.

Original production
Directed by Arthur French
Produced by Norman "Speedy" Hartmann and Tony Preston
Opened: November 13, 1967 at the Old Reliable Theatre Tavern in New York City.

Cast
 A. D. Cannon - Eustace Baylor
 Louise Mike - Soprano
 Mari Foreman - Cora Lee
 Gracie Carroll - Adelaide
 Ensley - Funeral Director
 Bette Howard - Reva Butler
 Pawnee Sills - Donna Butler
 Carl Gordon - Charlie Butler
 Barbara Clarke - Annette Butler
 Denise Nicholas - April Baylor
 David Downing - Stace Baylor
 Jack Landron - The Attendant

Notes
Introduces the character of Eustace Baylor, who later appears in Carter's award-winning play, Eden. The nonspeaking role of the attendant was added by the director, Arthur French.  Carter credits French for "putting meaning to the play" and putting him "on the map" as a playwright.

References

1967 plays
Plays by Steve Carter (playwright)
African-American plays